The First United Methodist Church, once the Methodist Episcopal Church, South, is a historic church at Main and Center Sts. in Bald Knob, Arkansas.  It is a single story frame structure, finished in brick, that was built in 1927 with a distinctive blend of Craftsman and Tudor Revival elements.   Its gable end is finished in half-timbered stucco, with a projecting bay of diamond-pane windows.

The building was listed on the National Register of Historic Places in 1992.

See also
National Register of Historic Places listings in White County, Arkansas

References

Churches on the National Register of Historic Places in Arkansas
Tudor Revival architecture in Arkansas
Gothic Revival church buildings in Arkansas
Churches in White County, Arkansas
National Register of Historic Places in White County, Arkansas
Buildings and structures in Bald Knob, Arkansas
American Craftsman architecture in Arkansas
1927 establishments in Arkansas
Bald Knob, Arkansas
Churches completed in 1927